The Supreme Director of the United Provinces of the Río de la Plata was a title given to the executive officers of the United Provinces of the Río de la Plata according to the form of government established in 1814 by the  (Assembly of Year XIII). The supreme director was to wield power for a term of two years.

The assembly hoped to confront the royalists, who had been emboldened by internal dissension within the patriotic faction. To prevent abuses of power, the directorship would be combined with a state council of nine members and would be required to answer to a congress empowered to carry out legislation.

After the resignation of José Rondeau following the unitarian defeat at the Battle of Cepeda, the office of Supreme Director was briefly assumed by Juan Pedro Aguirre. He endorsed the Buenos Aires Cabildo to name a governor for the province of Buenos Aires as the national congress dissolved itself on 16 February 1820, effectively ending the centralism in the national government and giving way to a new federal reorganization for the country, which was immediately formalized by the Treaty of Pilar on 23 February 1820.

Until 1826 there would not be any central authority among the provinces of Argentina.

List of Supreme Directors

See also
List of heads of state of Argentina
President of Argentina

References

Heads of state of former countries
Argentine War of Independence
1814 establishments in South America
1820 disestablishments in South America